Villeneuvois may refer to:
Villeneuve-les-Bordes commune inhabitants
Villeneuve-Saint-Denis inhabitants
Villeneuve-sous-Dammartin inhabitants
Villeneuve-sur-Bellot inhabitants